John 20:21 is the twenty-first verse of the twentieth chapter of the Gospel of John in the New Testament. It records Jesus' commission to the disciples during his first appearance after the resurrection.

Content
The original Koine Greek, according to the Textus Receptus, reads:

In the King James Version of the Bible it is translated as:
Then said Jesus to them again, Peace be unto you: as my Father hath sent me, even so send I you.

The modern World English Bible translates the passage as:
Jesus therefore said to them again, "Peace be to you. As the Father has sent me, even so I send you."

For a collection of other versions see BibleHub John 20:21

Analysis
The account of Jesus' first appearance in the Gospel of John (20:19-23) shows similarity to the account in the Gospel of Luke, that it happened in Jerusalem in the evening of his resurrection from the dead.

The words Peace be with you is a common traditional Jewish greeting still in use today (shalom alekem or  shalom lekom; cf. ), also spoken by Jesus in John 20:19 and 26.

The statement "as the Father has sent me, even so I send you" indicates that the missionary work of the disciples is dependent on the mission of Jesus, the Son of God. The repetition of the words of peace gives the emphasis on the importance of this commission. Each gospel records a commission from Jesus after resurrection.

References

Sources

External links
Jesus Appears to His Disciples

20:21
John 20:21